Henneguya zschokkei or Henneguya salminicola is a species of a myxosporean endoparasite. It afflicts several salmon in the genus Oncorhynchus. It causes milky flesh or tapioca disease. H. zschokkei is notable for its absence of mitochondria, mitochondrial DNA, aerobic respiration and its reliance on an as of yet undiscovered energy metabolism.

Description 
Henneguya salminicola is found in fish as an ovoid spore with two anterior polar capsules and two long caudal appendages. Individuals are very small (about 10 micrometers in diameter), but are found aggregated into cysts 3–6 mm in diameter at any place in the muscle mass.

Unknown metabolism 
Henneguya salminicola is the only known multicellular animal that does not rely on the aerobic respiration of oxygen. It lacks a mitochondrial genome and therefore mitochondria, making it one of the only known members of the eukaryotic animal kingdom to shun oxygen as the foundation of its metabolism. The means by which H. zschokkei utilizes chemical energy for the sustenance of its life is not yet known.

H. zschokkei is ultimately a highly derived cnidarian. This obligate internal parasite so little resembles other multicellular animals that it, along with many other species in class Myxosporea, were initially categorized as protozoa. It is nevertheless most closely related to jellyfish. This species, like most myxosporeans, lacks many of the diagnostic criteria that identify cnidarians. It is without nervous, epithelial, gut or muscle cells of any kind. 

This parasite has not only lost its mitochondria and the mitochondrial DNA residing in them, but also the nuclear genes that code for mitochondrial reproduction. What genetic instructions for these functions remain are in the form of useless pseudogenes.

Origins 
The origin and cause of its highly reduced genome are not yet known. While eukaryotes are known for aerobic respiration, a few unicellular lineages native to hypoxic environments have lost this capacity. In the absence of oxygen these single-celled organisms have lost portions of their genome governing aerobic respiration. Such eukaryotes have developed mitochondria-related organelles (MROs), which fulfill many of the functions of conventional mitochondria. However there is no evidence for such adaptation in the multicellular H. zschokkei. 

One theory explaining the highly unusual habit of H. zschokkei and its fellow myxosporeans invokes the cancers of cnidarians. On this explanation, animals such as H. zschokkei were originally cancerous growths in free-swimming jellyfish that escaped their parent organism and thereafter became a separate species parasitizing other animals. Such an origin is referred to as a SCANDAL (an acronym derived from the phrase "speciated by cancer development in animals").

Hosts 
Known hosts of Henneguya zschokkei include:
 Oncorhynchus gorbuscha (Pink salmon)
 Oncorhynchus keta (Chum salmon)
 Oncorhynchus kisutch (Coho salmon)
 Oncorhynchus nerka (Sockeye salmon)
 Anadromous forms of Oncorhynchus mykiss (Rainbow trout)
 Oncorhynchus tshawytscha (Chinook salmon)
 Salmo salar (Atlantic Salmon)

See also 
Taxa
 Cryptosporidium parvum, a protist (Apicomplexa) without genes in its mitochondria
 Mastigamoeba, an anaerobic protist (Amoebozoa) without mitochondria
 Monocercomonoides, a protist (Metamonad) without mitochondria
 Loricifera, other metazoans; some species don't require oxygen and may also lack mitochondria

Structures
 hydrogenosome, an organelle of some anaerobic taxa

References

Further reading

External links 
 
 GBIF: Henneguya salminicola Ward, 1919. Id:6881057, source: World Register of Marine Species
 GBIF: Henneguya zschokkei Ward, 1919. Id:6881028, source: Artsnavnebasen

Animal parasites of fish
Myxobolidae
Veterinary parasitology